Radyr Comprehensive School is an 11–18 mixed comprehensive school and sixth form college in Radyr, Cardiff, Wales that was established in 1972. The current roll is around 1,295 students, with around 280 of those in the sixth form.

The school is controlled by the Cardiff Education Authority. For the 2000–01 school year, demand for places from parents exceeded supply.

History

Prior to 1968, the majority of children from Radyr travelled nine miles to Penarth County Grammar School and St Cyres Secondary Modern School in Penarth by steam train daily, a quicker and easier option than road journeys to closer Cardiff secondary schools. The arrangement ceased when the direct rail route was closed by the Beeching Axe. The new Radyr Comprehensive School opened in 1972. In 2004, a new state-of-the-art sports hall, including a fitness suite, was built for the school.

In June 2007, the school site was said to be worth £25m, and it was reported by the South Wales Echo that Cardiff Council were considering plans to close the school as part of a reorganisation.

The school was criticised, in February 2008, after pupils aged 13 were instructed by a teacher to write imaginary suicide notes for an English lesson in order to "get into the mind of a troubled teenager". This was part of a study of the non-curriculum novel Noughts and Crosses by Malorie Blackman. However, the school is just a few miles from Bridgend where there had been multiple teenage suicides. The headmaster of the school stated that "the task was a 'spontaneous piece of writing' where children were asked not to turn over the page to find out what the letter said - but to write their own version of the suicide note" and "the teacher setting the text did not associate the task with news stories but considered it part of the textual study of a serious book dealing with serious issues in a serious way". Several relatives of the recently deceased Bridgend teenagers expressed their sorrow and regret that the unsuitable subject featured in a school project for such young children.

In September 2016, the school was subject to scrutiny following media coverage of 30 year old IT teacher Richard Shore's 'sexually motivated' relationship with a 17-year-old student. At a hearing, he denied having sex with the student and the CPS decided to take no further action. However, at his disciplinary hearing, Shore was found to be 'unfit to practice' due to seven cases of 'inappropriate behaviour' with the student, including inviting the student to his home and buying them gifts. Radyr Comprehensive suspended Shore prior to the hearing and ultimately the Fitness to Practise Committee removed Shore from the teaching register indefinitely. The relationship was alleged to begin on a 2014 school trip to California and a colleague in the IT department, Richard Edmunds, stated that his 'suspicions were raised' after the pair allegedly went jogging alone together on the trip.

In 2019, the school was named 'Welsh State School of the Year' in the Sunday Times Schools Guide.

However, in December 2020 a member of the school's IT department, Richard Edmunds (see above), was sentenced to 6 years and 3 months in Newport's Crown Court for grooming female students to obtain indecent photographs. Edmunds pled guilty to 19 offences and his computer was found to contain thousands of indecent photos and films of children. Nearly 100 of these were in Category A, the most serious category of child pornography. The court heard that the grooming had spanned 4 years, and that Edmunds had been arrested following a safeguarding report from Childline.

In June 2021, Radyr Comprehensive School was one of 2962 primary and secondary schools across the UK named in Everyone's Invited 2021 report. The report aims to raise awareness of rape culture in education and all of the institutions listed were named in testimonials submitted by survivors.

Academic performance
The proportion of pupils who achieved five or more grades A* to C in the 2003 GCSE examinations was above the national average, whilst the proportion of students achieving A level success at grades A to C in 2 or more subjects was below the national average.

In the Estyn inspection in April 2004, the standards reached in Religious Education at Key Stage 4 were considered unsatisfactory, but the remaining assessments ranged between satisfactory and very good, with notable performances in Art, Music, and Physical Education.

Sporting activities 

The girls' hockey team won the 2002 RAF Careers under-18 Schools Hockey Champions with a win over Chepstow School.

In the Wales Region Hard Track Cycling Championships held in July 2006, a pupil won the under-14 Girls' Omnium.

Extra-curricular activities

The School's Big Band was invited to entertain guests at Disneyland Paris in October 2006 and on 1 March 2007. The Band continued touring, and headed to Chicago in August 2008., for a packed week of events including a performance at the North American Welsh Festival and the Field Museum. The Jazz Band is run by students from 6th form with the help of the music department. The Jazz Band also has a training band which is open to students from Year 7 to Year 11. The Big Band in 2011, were invited back to Disneyland Paris and performed again, this time at the Videopolis (Disneyland Paris) stage.

The school's Green Flag Committee ensure that the school remains loyal to its eco-friendly policy, as set down in late 2008 following the granting of emergency powers to the Committee in order to deal with what was perceived as an imminent threat to the school's environmental well-being. The main objective was to aid the school in achieving the "Eco Schools Green Flag Award"; the Committee leads by example and tolerates neither litterers nor other undesirable elements. The school currently holds the silver award in the scheme, and is now aiming to achieve the award itself. In accordance with this, the Green Flag committee is affiliated with the Radyr and Morganstown Association.  The RGFC has taken proceedings one step further recently, by taking on the duties of providing extra care to Radyr Railway Station as part of the Arriva Trains Wales adopt a station scheme. The Green Flag ceased production in early 2008. However, in 2010, a subsidiary committee to the school council was set up to continue the work of the RGFC.

Notable former pupils from the school

 Timothy Benjamin, runner.
 Nickie Aiken, Conservative MP
 Gareth Bennett, UKIP Member of the National Assembly for Wales
 Emily Burnett, actor
 Carole Cadwalladr, British journalist and author
 Paul Duddridge , film director/producer/writer.
 Greg Holmes, cricketer
 Lucie Jones, actress, model and X Factor UK 2009 final twelve contestant and singer.
 Jann Mardenborough, racing driver
 Tom Maynard, late professional cricketer.
 Jimi Mistry, Actor, known for roles on Coronation Street, EastEnders, The Guru and East Is East.
 Tom Lockyer professional footballer
 Harry Robinson professional rugby player

References

External links 

Secondary schools in Cardiff
1972 establishments in Wales
Educational institutions established in 1972
Radyr